Sayla is a sub-district of Surendranagar district, Gujarat, India.

Villages in Sayla

See also 
 Sayla city
 Juna Jashapar
 Chotila

References 

 http://www.census2011.co.in/data/village/512426-sayla-gujarat.html

Villages in Surendranagar district
Surendranagar
Taluka of Surendranagar